Diana Spencer (1961–1997), later Diana, Princess of Wales, was the first wife of King Charles III.

Diana Spencer may also refer to: 

Diana Spencer (classicist), professor of classics
Diana Spencer (diver) (born 1934), British Olympic diver
Lady Diana Beauclerk (née Lady Diana Spencer, 1734–1808), English noblewoman and artist
Diana Russell, Duchess of Bedford (née Lady Diana Spencer, 1710–1735), wife of John Russell, 4th Duke of Bedford

See also 
Lady Di (disambiguation)
Princess Diana (disambiguation)